Elizabeth Anne Camp (born January 10, 1974) is an American politician from Georgia. Camp is a Republican member of Georgia House of Representatives for District 131.
Camp is a graduate of Georgia Military College in Milledgeville, GA. She earned a bachelor degree in Integrative Studies/Psychology from Clayton State University and a masters degree from the University of Alabama in Communications Studies.

Camp was sworn in to represent House District 131 January 11, 2021. After redistricting, she was reelected as House Representative to the newly formed House District 135 being sworn in for a second term on January 9, 2023.

Camp serves on the following committees in the Georgia House of Representatives 2023-2024 session: Intergovernmental Coordination (Chairman); Agriculture & Consumer Affairs; Energy, Utilities & Telecommunications; State Planning; Juvenile Justice; and Ways & Means.

References

|-

Republican Party members of the Georgia House of Representatives
21st-century American politicians
Living people
21st-century American women politicians
Women state legislators in Georgia (U.S. state)
1974 births